Võ Nhật Tân (born 27 June 1987) is a Vietnamese footballer who plays as a defender for V.League 2 club Long An.

References 

1987 births
Living people
Vietnamese footballers
Association football defenders
V.League 1 players
SHB Da Nang FC players
People from Tiền Giang province